Kiyokazu (written: 清一, 清種, 清枚, 清和, 潔和, or きよかず in hiragana) is a masculine Japanese given name. Notable people with the name include:

, Imperial Japanese Navy admiral
, Japanese manga artist
, Japanese shogi player
, Japanese footballer
, Japanese daimyō
, Japanese philosopher

Japanese masculine given names